Karmsund Bridge is a bridge over the Karmsundet strait in Rogaland county, Norway. The bridge is located in Karmøy municipality and it links the island of Karmøy to the Norwegian mainland. The steel arched road bridge carries the European route E134 highway. It was completed in 1955.

See also
List of bridges in Norway
List of bridges in Norway by length
List of bridges
List of bridges by length

References

Bridges in Rogaland
Bridges completed in 1955
Through arch bridges
1955 establishments in Norway